Jacso Entertainment is a media, entertainment, artist management, production and distribution, and online marketing company based in Hong Kong. The Group was initially founded by Celia Sie in 2009 as a social publishing platform.

History
After graduating from The University of Hong Kong, Celia Sie started her entertainment career as program host in the Metro Broadcast from 1997 to 2000.  She was the founder of Moral Champ PR & Marketing Limited from 2005 to 2012 for its public relation business.  She founded Jasco Group in 2009 as social publishing platform.

In early 2011, Jacso Entertainment managed a number of artistes including Dada Chan, Iris Chung, Monna Lam, Celia Kwok, Meimei Tsang, Asa Kwan, Ayu Wong, Diva Hui, Kaylie Kan, Bella Lo, Bambi Leung, Liz Li, and Moonie Lau from Hong Kong where Moka Fang and Una Wu are based in Shanghai, China. Jacso Artistes Management was formed in 2012 as a joint venture of eSun Holdings specialized in Hong Kong film production and distribution.

In 2014, Jacso extended its entertainment empire to media development.

In July 2016, Jacso Entertainment merged with the production company of the actor Louis Koo.

Description
The Jacso Group hosts events, showcases and concerts in Hong Kong, Macau and China for various Korean stars. Jacso has its own production and distribution of Korean movies and variety shows.

Subsidiaries :
 Jacso Entertainment Limited
 Jacso Artistes Management Limited
 Jacso Media
 Jacso Production and Distribution

Artists

References

External links
 

Lai Sun Group
Entertainment companies of Hong Kong